Carlos Elizondo is an American event planner and political aide who is the current White House social secretary since 2021. Elizondo previously served as a special assistant and social secretary for Joe Biden and Jill Biden during the Obama administration.

Early life and education
A native of Harlingen, Texas, Elizondo earned a Bachelor of Arts degree in Spanish and Latin American studies from the Pontifical College Josephinum.

Career
From 2009 to 2017, Elizondo served as a special assistant to President Barack Obama and as Social Secretary to Vice President Joe Biden and Second Lady Jill Biden. In this role, he planned and managed all events which were hosted by Biden and his family, including visits by world leaders, members of Congress, and other high-profile visitors. Outside of government, Elizondo worked as the director of events at Georgetown University and the manager of activities and protocol at Walt Disney World.

On November 20, 2020, after winning the presidential election, Biden named Elizondo to be his White House social secretary. He is the first Hispanic individual and second openly gay person to hold the position.

Personal life 
Elizondo is openly gay, and resides in Washington, D.C. with his partner.

References

Living people
Biden administration personnel
Obama administration personnel
White House staff
Event planners
Pontifical College Josephinum alumni
People from Harlingen, Texas
LGBT Hispanic and Latino American people
LGBT people from Texas
Year of birth missing (living people)
Gay politicians